Daijo-ike  is an earthfill dam located in Hyogo Prefecture in Japan. The dam is used for irrigation. The dam impounds about 7  ha of land when full and can store 946 thousand cubic meters of water. The construction of the dam was completed in 1928.

See also
List of dams in Japan

References

Dams in Hyogo Prefecture